The 2011–12 Cleveland State Vikings men's basketball team represents Cleveland State University in the 2011–12 NCAA Division I men's basketball season. Their head coach was Gary Waters. The Vikings play their home games at the Wolstein Center and are members of the Horizon League. It was the 81st season of Cleveland State basketball.

Previous season
Last year's team finished the season 27–9, 13–5 in Horizon League play to share the regular season conference title with Butler and Milwaukee. They played in the NIT, advancing to the second round.

Preseason
The preseason Horizon League Coaches' Poll picked the Vikings to finish third with two first place votes behind Butler and Detroit, with 28 and 19 first place votes, respectively.

Regular season
In the preseason rankings Cleveland State received no points or votes in the AP or ESPN/USA Today coaches poll. On November 7, 2011 Cleveland State received 43 points in the AP poll for 29th overall and 13 votes in the coaches poll for a ranking of 35th. On November 14, 2011 Cleveland State received 94 points in the AP poll for a ranking of 26th. In the coaches poll Cleveland State received 20 points for a ranking of 34th.

Roster

Schedule

|-
!colspan=9| Exhibition

|-
!colspan=9| Regular season

|-
!colspan=12|Horizon League tournament

|-
!colspan=12|NIT

Rankings

References

Cleveland State
Cleveland State Vikings men's basketball seasons
Cleveland State
Viking
Viking